Charley's Aunt is a 1930 American pre-Code comedy film directed by Al Christie and starring Charles Ruggles, June Collyer, and Hugh Williams. It was an adaptation of the 1892 play Charley's Aunt by Brandon Thomas. It marked the film debut of Williams, who then returned to Britain and became a major star.

Cast
 Charles Ruggles as Lord Fancourt Babberley
 June Collyer as  Amy Spettigue
 Hugh Williams as Charlie Wykeham
 Doris Lloyd as Donna Lucia D' Alvadorez
 Halliwell Hobbes as Stephen Spettigue
 Flora le Breton as Ela Delahay
 Rodney McLennan as Jack Chesney
 Phillips Smalley as  Sir Francis Chesney
 Flora Sheffield as Kitty Verdun
 Wilson Benge as Brassett
 Robert Bolder as Scotty  
 Edgar Norton as Spettigue's Lawyer

References

External links

allmovie/synopsis; Charley's Aunt

Bibliography
 Sweet, Matthew. Shepperton Babylon: The Lost Worlds of British Cinema. Faber and Faber, 2005.

1930 films
1930 comedy films
1930s English-language films
Films directed by Al Christie
Films based on Charley's Aunt
Columbia Pictures films
American comedy films
American black-and-white films
Films set in England
1930s American films